"Indestructible" is a song by American heavy metal band Disturbed, released as the third single from their studio album of the same name. The single peaked at No. 2 on the Hot Mainstream Rock Tracks chart and No. 10 on the Hot Modern Rock Tracks chart. The music video for the song appeared on Disturbed's website on August 20, 2008, and the single was released on September 29, 2008. "Indestructible" is meant to encourage troops going into battle, and boost their morale. It is also meant to represent Disturbed's success in the music industry. It is one of Disturbed's best known songs. The song appeared in the video game Midnight Club: Los Angeles.

Interpretation
"Indestructible" is "an anthem for soldiers", vocalist David Draiman comments. "It's meant to be something that would make them feel invincible, take away their fear, make them strong." According to Draiman, the song also signifies Disturbed's lingering presence and success in the music industry. Draiman comments that the song "kind of symbolizes the fact that we're still fucking here, that we haven't been destroyed, that we withstood the test of time."

Guitarist Dan Donegan furthers this point, stating "We feel that we've become indestructible to be able to survive this long in the business, and continuing a success with it." Draiman concludes, "We have been through a lot. No matter what gets thrown at us, as a band, no matter what happens in the musical environment, we're still here, we're still viable, and still standing."

Music video
A music video went into production in June 2008 with Noble Jones as the director, and was unveiled on August 20, 2008. It features high-concept battle scenes, reminiscent of the films 300 and 10,000 BC, intercut with footage of the band performing the song. The video shows the progression of war throughout history; from basic fighting with spears, to using modern weaponry such as firearms.

The video is unique in that it does break tradition from past historical depictions of armed combat that have, until a few years ago, always shown combatants to be exclusively male by featuring a closing scene of an armed female soldier-warrior, presumably American, charging headlong towards the threat to her fellow soldiers, her "brothers-in-arms".

Track listing
UK

UK 7" vinyl limited edition

Digital

Chart positions

Personnel
Dan Donegan – guitar, producer, electronics
David Draiman – lead vocals, backing vocals co-producer
Mike Wengren – drums, co-producer
John Moyer – bass guitar
Neal Avron – mixing

Release history

References

Disturbed (band) songs
2008 singles
2008 songs
Reprise Records singles
Songs written by David Draiman
Songs written by Dan Donegan
Songs written by Mike Wengren